Cop Land is a 1997 American neo-noir crime drama film written and directed by James Mangold. It stars an ensemble cast that includes Sylvester Stallone, Harvey Keitel, Ray Liotta, and Robert De Niro, with Peter Berg, Janeane Garofalo, Robert Patrick, Michael Rapaport, Annabella Sciorra, Noah Emmerich, and Cathy Moriarty in supporting roles. Stallone portrays the sheriff of a small New Jersey town who comes into conflict with the corrupt New York City police officers living in the community. The film received positive reviews and grossed $63.7 million on a $15 million budget.

Plot 
The town of Garrison, New Jersey is home to a cadre of policemen from the NYPD's 37th Precinct: Lt. Ray Donlan, Det. Leo Crasky, and officers Gary Figgis, Jack Rucker, Frank Lagonda, and Joey Randone. Exploiting a loophole in department regulations allowing them to live outside the city by being designated "auxiliary transit cops", Donlan and his group are effectively untouchable by the NYPD's Internal Affairs division and are further protected by Sheriff Freddy Heflin. Unable to fulfill his lifelong dream of joining the NYPD due to deafness in one ear after nearly drowning while rescuing a woman years earlier, Heflin idolizes Donlan and refuses to help IA investigator Lt. Moe Tilden in his attempt to build a case against the dirty cops.

One night, Donlan's nephew, Officer Murray Babitch, is sideswiped by two African-American teens while driving across the George Washington Bridge. One of the teens points what looks like a weapon at Babitch just as his tire blows out from a glass puncture; a frightened Babitch shoots them both dead. Donlan, Rucker, and Crasky show up and try to plant a gun in the teens' car, only to get caught by a paramedic. In desperation, Donlan convinces Babitch to fake his suicide before hiding him in Garrison with a promise that he will set him up with a new identity.

Randone's wife Liz—the woman Heflin saved from drowning—visits Heflin at his home and they confess their feelings for each other. Meanwhile, Figgis is kicked out of Donlan's circle, and his house burns down soon after with his girlfriend inside; Heflin lets him stay at his home thinking that Donlan tried to kill him. Fearing that Babitch will expose him, Donlan unsuccessfully tries to drown his nephew. Babitch then goes to Heflin for help but flees when he sees Figgis. While on patrol, Randone is attacked and thrown over the edge of a building; Donlan deliberately lets him fall in retaliation for Randone's affair with his wife Rose.

Heflin, tired of being pushed around by Donlan and his men, visits Tilden to offer his help with the investigation, only to learn that the mayor, under pressure from Donlan's allies in the police union, has ordered IA to cease investigating. As Heflin leaves, he steals discarded IA files that reveal Donlan's ties to the mob and how he used those connections to create a safe haven in Garrison while trafficking drugs through the 37th Precinct, even having a cop who sought to testify against him stabbed to death in his jail cell. Heflin brings the files to his deputies Cindy and Bill, but Cindy, tired of the corruption in Garrison, resigns from her post.

After Lagonda threatens him at gunpoint, Heflin looks into the fire at Figgis' house and realizes that it was arson. Figgis admits that he started the fire to commit insurance fraud so he could leave Garrison and start over. The two men argue, and Figgis abandons Heflin and drives away. Heflin goes to Rose and convinces her to reveal where Babitch is hiding, planning to hand him over to Tilden. After sending Bill away for his own protection, Heflin walks Babitch over to his car but is ambushed by Rucker who fires a gun next to his good ear, leaving him completely deaf. Discombobulated, Heflin follows him as he drives Babitch over to Donlan's residence.

In the ensuing shootout, Heflin kills Lagonda and Rucker; Crasky wounds him in the shoulder before Figgis suddenly appears and guns him down. Inside, Donlan tries to shoot Heflin in the back before Figgis distracts him, resulting in Heflin fatally shooting him in the chest. The two men drive Babitch to One Police Plaza and deliver him to Tilden. Figgis turns state's evidence, resulting in sweeping arrests and indictments across the union, the mob, and the 37th Precinct. Heflin undergoes medical treatment to fix his good ear and returns to his old job in Garrison.

Cast 

 Sylvester Stallone as Sheriff Freddy Heflin 
 Harvey Keitel as Ray Donlan
 Ray Liotta as Gary "Figgsy" Figgis
 Robert De Niro as Moe Tilden
 Peter Berg as Joey Randone
 Janeane Garofalo as Deputy Sheriff Cindy Betts
 Robert Patrick as Officer Jack Rucker
 Michael Rapaport as Murray "Superboy" Babitch
 Annabella Sciorra as Liz Randone
 Noah Emmerich as Deputy Sheriff Bill Geisler
 Cathy Moriarty as Rose Donlan
 John Spencer as Leo Crasky
 Frank Vincent as PDA President Vince Lassaro
 Malik Yoba as Detective Carson
 Arthur Nascarella as Officer Frank Lagonda
 Victor Williams as Officer Russell Ames
 Edie Falco as Berta (Bomb Squad Agent)
 Mel Gorham as Monica Lopez
 Paul Herman as carnival worker
 Paul Calderón as Hector (GWB Paramedic)
 Vincent Laresca as Robert (GWB Paramedic)
 Method Man as Shondel (rooftop perp)
 Deborah Harry as Delores (4 Aces bartender)
 John Ventimiglia as Officer V 
 Tony Sirico as Salvatore "Toy" Torillo (photo only)

Production 

Mangold grew up in a development called Worley Heights, where many of the residents were current and former NYPD police officers.
Stallone gained  to portray the beaten-down sheriff of Garrison. 

The principal shooting location for the film was Edgewater, New Jersey.

Music 

The film's soundtrack features two songs from Bruce Springsteen's 1980 album The River: "Drive All Night" and "Stolen Car", songs by other artists, and an original score from Howard Shore. One additional song, Blue Öyster Cult's "Burnin' for You", was added to the soundtrack of the director's cut, first released on home video in 2004.

The score by Howard Shore was performed by the London Philharmonic Orchestra and released as Cop Land: Music from the Miramax Motion Picture in 1997. The soundtrack released on CD contained twelve tracks, with a runtime of 40:11 minutes.

Release

Theatrical 
Cop Land premiered at the Ziegfeld Theater in New York City on August 6, 1997. Some of the film's cast members attended, including Stallone, Keitel, Liotta, Sciorra, Moriarty and Rapaport.

Stallone's understated performance was praised by critics and he received the Best Actor award at the Stockholm International Film Festival. Cop Land was also screened at the 54th Venice Film Festival in the Midnight line-up. Earlier in May 1997, the film was accepted into the main competition at the Cannes Film Festival, but Miramax declined the invitation due to re-shoots that were needed for the film, including footage of Stallone 40 pounds heavier.

Home media 
Cop Land has been released on VHS, Laserdisc and DVD numerous times since 1998. The US laserdisc release had the theatrical cut in letterboxed (non-anamorphic) widescreen with special features consisting of an audio commentary with director James Mangold on the left analogue channel and chapter 16 of the laserdisc containing deleted scenes. The initial extras-free DVDs had the theatrical cut in non-anamorphic widescreen, while subsequent issues, including various "Collector's Editions" on DVD and Blu-ray, have favoured the director's cut. StudioCanal's French and German region B-locked Blu-rays exclusively feature both the 101-minute theatrical cut and 116-minute director's cut.

Extras include an audio commentary (with James Mangold, Sylvester Stallone, Robert Patrick, and producer Cathy Konrad), "The Making of an Urban Western" featurette, a storyboard comparison, two deleted scenes and the theatrical trailer.

The two deleted scenes primarily show the racism in the town of Garrison. One scene involves all the resident police officers chasing down a pair of black motorists, and the other shows Heflin's deputy pointing out that the majority of the tickets issued in Garrison go to black motorists on charges that suggest racial profiling.

Reception

Critical response 

On review aggregator Rotten Tomatoes, the film holds an approval rating of 75% based on 67 reviews, with an average rating of 6.5/10. The site's critics consensus reads: "Cop Land gifts its star-studded cast with richly imagined characters while throttling the audience with carefully-ratcheted suspense, although this potboiler lacks the moral complexity of the crime classics that it harkens to." On Metacritic it has a weighted average score of 64 out of 100 based on 21 critics, indicating "generally favorable reviews". Audiences polled by CinemaScore gave the film an average grade of "B−" on an A+ to F scale.

Roger Ebert gave the film two out of four stars and wrote, "There is a rough balance between how long a movie is, how deep it goes and how much it can achieve. That balance is not found in Cop Land and the result is too much movie for the running time". On the other hand, Gene Siskel praised the movie, especially the screenplay, as "one to be savored."

Janet Maslin of The New York Times wrote that "the strength of Cop Land is in its hard-edged, novelistic portraits, which pile up furiously during the film's dynamic opening scenes ... Yet if the price of Mangold's casting ambitions is a story that can't, finally, match its marquee value, that value is still inordinately strong. Everywhere the camera turns in this tense and volatile drama, it finds enough interest for a truckload of conventional Hollywood fare. Whatever its limitations, Cop Land has talent to burn".

Entertainment Weekly gave the film a "B−" rating, and Owen Gleiberman wrote, "Stallone does a solid, occasionally winning job of going through the motions of shedding his stardom, but the wattage of his personality is turned way down—at times, it's turned down to neutral. And that pretty much describes Cop Land, too. Dense, meandering, ambitious yet jarringly pulpy, this tale of big-city corruption in small-town America has competence without mood or power—a design but not a vision". In her review for The Washington Post, Rita Kempley wrote, "With its redundancy of supporting characters, snarled subplots and poky pace, Cop Land really might have been better off trading the director for a traffic cop". Rolling Stone magazine's Peter Travers praised Stallone's performance: "His performance builds slowly but achieves a stunning payoff when Freddy decides to clean up his town ... Freddy awakes to his own potential, and it's exhilarating to watch the character and the actor revive in unison. Nearly down for the count in the movie ring, Stallone isn't just back in the fight. He's a winner". In his review for the San Francisco Chronicle, Mick LaSalle also liked Stallone's work: "His transformation is more than a matter of weight. He looks spiritually beaten and terribly sad. He looks like a real person, not a cult-of-the-body film star, and he uses the opportunity to deliver his best performance in years".

With its dark tone and all-star dramatic cast, Cop Land was a shift from Stallone's recent comic efforts which were critical and box office bombs (1991's Oscar and 1992's Stop! Or My Mom Will Shoot).  Additionally, Cop Land was to show Stallone in a completely different light, both physically (his 40-pound weight gain got a lot of press coverage), as well as artistically, by letting him showcase his acting skills. The film posted solid box-office takings ($44.9 million domestically), got good reviews, and Stallone received positive critical notices for his performance. Yet Stallone has said the film was bad for his career. In a 2019 interview Stallone called Mangold "the best director I ever worked with [but the film] actually worked in reverse. It was pretty good critically, but the fact that it didn't do a lot of box office, again it fomented the opinion that I had my moment and was going the way of the dodo bird and the Tasmanian tiger."

James Mangold said the hype due to the casting "overscaled the movie" and added: "I'm very proud of the movie and the ideas in it, but one of the things that was difficult for me at the time was that I'd imagined the lead being someone you hadn't heard of before, so that their extension into a hero would be less Hollywood."

References

External links 

 
 
 
 

1997 films
1997 crime thriller films
1990s English-language films
1990s police films
American crime thriller films
American neo-noir films
American police detective films
Films about the New York City Police Department
Films about police corruption
Films about police misconduct
Films directed by James Mangold
Films produced by Cathy Konrad
Films scored by Howard Shore
Films set in New Jersey
Films set in New York City
Films shot in New Jersey
Films with screenplays by James Mangold
Miramax films
1990s American films
Films about disability